Anton Ludwig Friedrich August von Mackensen (born Mackensen; 6 December 1849 – 8 November 1945), ennobled as "von Mackensen" in 1899, was a German field marshal. He commanded successfully during World War I (1914–1918) and became one of the German Empire's most prominent and competent military leaders. After the armistice of 11 November 1918, the victorious Allies interned Mackensen in Serbia for a year. In 1920, he retired from the army. In 1933 Hermann Göring made him a Prussian state councillor. During the Nazi era (1933–1945), Mackensen remained a committed monarchist and sometimes appeared at official functions in his World War I uniform. Senior Nazi Party members suspected him of disloyalty, but nothing was proven against him.

Early life and career
Mackensen was born in Haus Leipnitz, near the village of Dahlenberg (today part of Trossin) in the Prussian Province of Saxony, to Ludwig and Marie Louise Mackensen. His father, an administrator of agricultural enterprises, sent him to a Realgymnasium in Halle in 1865, seemingly in the hope that his eldest son would follow him in his profession.

Mackensen began his military service in 1869 as a volunteer with the Prussian 2nd Life Hussars Regiment (Leib-Husaren-Regiment Nr. 2). During the Franco-Prussian War of 1870–1871, he was promoted to second lieutenant and won the Iron Cross Second Class for leading a charge on a reconnaissance patrol north of Orléans. After the war, he left the service and studied at Halle University but returned to the German Army in 1873 with his old regiment.

He married Doris (Dorothea) von Horn, the sister of a slain comrade, in 1879. Her father, was the influential Oberpräsident of East Prussia. They had two daughters and three sons. He found a mentor from the War Minister Julius von Verdy du Vernois. In 1891, Mackensen was appointed to the General Staff in Berlin and bypassed the usual three-year preparation in the War Academy. His chief, Helmuth von Moltke, found him a "lovable character".

Mackensen was recalled from the regiment to serve as an adjutant to the next chief, Alfred von Schlieffen (in office 1891–1906), whom he regarded as a great instructor on how to lead armies of millions.

Mackensen impressed Kaiser Wilhelm II, who ordered that Mackensen be given command from 17 June 1893 of the 1st Life Hussars Regiment (Leib-Husaren-Regiment Nr. 1) to which he became à la suite when he left its command on 27 January 1898 and so he often wore the distinctive death's head uniform thereafter. Mackensen was surprised by his next posting, as adjutant to Wilhelm II because he was the first commoner to hold that position. For the next three-and-a-half years, he shadowed the Kaiser and met the high and mighty of Germany, the rest of Europe and the Middle East. His sons shared gymnastics classes with the Kaiser's. Mackensen was ennobled on the Kaiser's 40th birthday, 27 January 1899, and became August von Mackensen.

Next, he received the command of the newly-created Life Hussar Brigade (Leib-Husaren-Brigade) from 1901 to 1903, and from 1903 to 1908, he commanded the 36th Division in Danzig.

His wife died in 1905, and two years later, he married Leonie von der Osten, who was 22 years old. When Schlieffen retired in 1906, Mackensen was considered as a possible successor, but the position went to Helmuth von Moltke the Younger. In 1908, Mackensen was given command of the XVII Army Corps, headquartered in Danzig. The Crown Prince was placed under his command, and the Kaiser asked Mackensen to keep an eye on the young man and to teach him to ride properly.

First World War

Eastern Front 

Already aged 65 at the outbreak of war in 1914, Mackensen's XVII Army Corps became part of the German Eighth Army in East Prussia, under General Maximilian von Prittwitz and, 21 days later, under General Paul von Hindenburg. Mackensen had his corps moving out on a 25 km march to the Rominte River within fifty minutes of receiving his orders on the afternoon of 19 August 1914, after the Imperial Russian Army had invaded East Prussia. He led the XVII Corps in the battles of Gumbinnen, Tannenberg and the First Battle of the Masurian Lakes, which drove the invading Russians out of most of East Prussia.

On 2 November 1914, Mackensen took over command of the Ninth Army from Hindenburg, who became Supreme Commander East (Oberbefehlshaber Ost). On 27 November 1914, Mackensen was awarded the Pour le Mérite, Prussia's highest military order, for successful battles around Warsaw and Łódź.

By April 1915, the Russians had conquered much of western Galicia and were pushing toward Hungary. In response to the desperate pleas, German Chief of Staff Erich von Falkenhayn agreed to an offensive against the Russian flank by an Austro-German army under a German commander. The reluctant Austro-Hungarian supreme command agreed that the tactful Mackensen was the best choice for commanding the coalition army. Army Group Mackensen (Heeresgruppe Mackensen) was established, containing a new German Eleventh Army, also under his command, and the Austro-Hungarian Fourth Army. As chief of staff, he was assigned Hans von Seeckt, who described Mackensen as an amiable, "hands-on commander with the instincts of a hunter". His army group, which had an overwhelming advantage in artillery, smashed through the Russian lines between Gorlice and Tarnow and then continued eastward. Never giving the Russians time to establish an effective defence, it retook most of eastern Galicia by recapturing Przemyśl and Lemberg. The joint operation was a great victory for the Central Powers, which had advanced 310 km (186 mi), and the Russians pulled out of all of Poland soon afterward.
 
Mackensen was awarded oak leaves to his Pour le Mérite on 3 June 1915 and was promoted to field marshal on 22 June. He also received the Order of the Black Eagle, Prussia's highest-ranking order of knighthood, as well as numerous honorus from other German states and Germany's allies, including the Grand Cross of the Military Order of Max Joseph, the highest military honor of the Kingdom of Bavaria, on 4 June 1915.

Serbian campaign

In October 1915, a new Army Group Mackensen (Heeresgruppe Mackensen, which included the German Eleventh Army, the Austro-Hungarian Third Army and the Bulgarian First Army), launched a renewed campaign against Serbia. The campaign crushed effective military resistance in Serbia but failed to destroy the Royal Serbian Army, half of which managed to withdraw to Entente-held ports in Albania and, after recuperation and rearmament by the French and the Italians, re-entered fighting on the Macedonian front. When Mackensen returned to Vienna, he was honoured by a dinner and a personal audience with Emperor Franz Joseph I of Austria and was decorated with the magnificently jeweled Military Merit Cross 1st Class with Diamonds, a unique award for a foreigner.

Mackensen appears to have had great respect for the Serbian Army and Serbs generally. Before departing to the Serbian front in 1915, he had spoken to his men:

Romanian campaign

After Romania declared war on Austria-Hungary on 15 August 1916, Mackensen was given command of a multinational army, with General Emil von Hell as chief of staff, of Bulgarians, Ottomans, Austro-Hungarians and Germans. It assembled in northern Bulgaria and then advanced into Dobruja. By 8 September, it had taken the two major forts on the right bank of the Danube, the first in a single day by a force that was outnumbered by the besieged, who were overwhelmed by Mackensen's artillery. Then, a German and Austro-Hungarian army group that was commanded by Falkenhayn broke into Wallachia through the Vulkan Pass in the Transylvanian Carpathian Mountains while Mackensen crossed the Danube by seizing bridgeheads on the left bank to shield the Austro-Hungarian engineers who built the long pontoon bridge. The Romanian Army and its Russian allies were forced back between those pincers. After three months of war, two thirds of Romania was occupied by the Central Powers. The capital of Romania, Bucharest, was captured by the Central Powers on 6 December 1916, on his 67th birthday. He rode in on a white horse and moved into the Romanian royal palace.  
For that performance, on 9 January 1917, Mackensen was awarded the Grand Cross of the Iron Cross and became one of only five recipients of that honour in the First World War. Since he now wore every Prussian medal, the Kaiser decided to name a battle cruiser after him, which became the first in a new class. Mackensen became the military governor of the large part of Romania (mainly Wallachia) that was occupied by the Central Powers. He proposed making a German prince the King of Romania, but the initiative fell through. His last campaign was an attempt to destroy the Romanian Army, which had been reorganised.

During the Battle of Mărăşeşti, both sides took heavy losses, but the Romanian Army emerged victoriously. Mackensen maintained that he had never been defeated in battle, and he surely was the most consistently successful senior general on either side in World War I. By December 1917, the Russian Army had collapsed, and the Romanian Armed Forces were forced to sign the Armistice of Focșani, followed by the Treaty of Bucharest.

On 11 November 1918, Germany signed an an armistice with the Allies under which it had to immediately withdraw all German troops in Romania, the Ottoman Empire, Austria-Hungary and the Russian Empire back to German territory and Allies to have access to those countries.

Postwar
After the armistice, he and the 200,000 men whom he led back home were rounded up. He was arrested by the agents of the pro-Entente Hungarian leader Mihály Károlyi in Budapest. Mackensen was held in a guarded villa at the edge of Budapest. Later, he was handled over to the representatives of General Louis Franchet d'Espèrey's Allied army, and he was held as a military prisoner in Futog, Serbia, until November 1919. He was one of the 896 Germans on the Allied list of accused war criminals, which was eventually allowed to lapse.

By 1920, Mackensen retired from the army. Although standing in opposition to the conclusion of the Treaty of Versailles and the newly-established parliamentary system of the Weimar Republic, he initially avoided public campaigns. Around 1924, he changed his mind and began to use his image as a war hero to support monarchist and nationalist groups. He routinely appeared in his old Life Hussars uniform and became very active in pro-military Conservative Revolutionary movement organisations, particularly Der Stahlhelm and the Schlieffen Society, which advocated the stab-in-the-back myth and openly endorsed the murder of Minister Matthias Erzberger in 1921.
 
During the German presidential election of 1932, Mackensen supported Paul von Hindenburg against Adolf Hitler, whose political skills he nevertheless admired. After Hitler gained power in January 1933, Mackensen became a visible, if only symbolic, supporter of the Nazi regime. One of Mackensen's ceremonial visits brought him to Passau, where he received a hero's welcome.

Occasionally mocked as the "Reich Centrepiece", Mackensen's distinctive public profile in his black Life Hussars uniform was even recognised by the Hausser-Elastolin company, which produced a 7 cm figure of him in its line of Elastolin composition soldiers. His fame and familiar uniform gave rise to two separate Third Reich units adopting black dress with Totenkopf badges: the Panzerwaffe, which claimed the tradition of the Imperial Cavalry, and the Schutzstaffel. In October 1935, the government vested Mackensen with the Brandenburg demesne of Brüssow in recognition of his merits.

Mackensen's relationship to the Nazis remained ambiguous: embodying the Prussian traditions adopted by Hitler's regime, he appeared in his black uniform at public events organised by the German government or the Nazi Party such as the Day of Potsdam on 21 March 1933. On the other hand, he objected to the killing of Generals Ferdinand von Bredow and Kurt von Schleicher during The Night of the Long Knives purge of July 1934, to the Nazi Kirchenkampf measures against the Confessing Church and to the atrocities that were committed during the invasion of Poland in September 1939. By the early 1940s, Hitler and Joseph Goebbels suspected Mackensen of disloyalty but refrained from taking action. Mackensen remained a committed monarchist and in June 1941 appeared in full imperial uniform at Kaiser Wilhelm funeral at Doorn, in the Netherlands.

According to a radio news report dated 15 April 1945 that was filed by the CBS News correspondent Larry LeSueur for World News Today, Mackensen was briefly captured by the British Second Army at his home during the closing weeks of the Second World War. Upon the arrival of the British, apparently not commenting on the general rout, the 95-year-old Mackensen merely asked the new powers-that-be that "freed foreign workers" be prevented "from stealing his chicken".

Mackensen died on 8 November 1945 at the age of 95, his life having spanned the Kingdom of Prussia, the North German Confederation, the German Empire, the Weimar Republic, the Third Reich and the postwar Allied occupation of Germany. He was buried in the Celle cemetery.

Family 

In November 1879, Mackensen married Dorothea von Horn (1854–1905), and they had five children:
 Else Mackensen (1881/2–1888)
 Hans Georg von Mackensen (1883–1947), diplomat
 Manfred von Mackensen (1886–1947)
 Eberhard von Mackensen (1889–1969), Generaloberst, German Army
 Ruth von Mackensen (1897–1945)

In 1908, after the death of his first wife, Mackensen married Leonie von der Osten (1878–1963).

Mackensen and his family were Lutheran Protestants in the Evangelical Church of Prussia.

Quote 
On 4 February 1940, Mackensen wrote to then Generaloberst Walther von Brauchitsch:

Honours 
 Grand Cross of the Order of Franz Joseph, 1900
 Pour le Mérite (military), 27 November 1914 – for his work on the Russian front; with Oak Leaves, 14 June 1915
 Grand Cross of the Military Order of Max Joseph, 4 June 1915
 Grand Commander of the Royal House Order of Hohenzollern, 1915
 Knight of the Order of the Black Eagle, August 1915
 Grand Cross of the Order of St. Stephen, September 1915
 Military Merit Cross, 1st Class with Diamonds, 6 December 1915
 Commander of the Military Order of St. Henry, 1st Class, 6 December 1915
 Grand Cross of the Iron Cross, 9 January 1917
 Iron Cross 2nd Class 1870 Version with commemorative oak leaves bearing on them the number 25 in celebration of the 25th anniversary of the german victory in the Franco-Prussian war given to all recipients of the iron cross 2nd class of 1870
 Iron Cross 1st Class 1914 Version 
 Grand Cross of the Order of St. Alexander, with Diamonds
 Grand Cross of the Military Order of Maria Theresa, 26 March 1918
 Order of Osmanieh, 2nd Class
 Order of the Medjidie, 1st Class
 Commander of the Merit Order of Philip the Magnanimous, 2nd Class
 Grand Commander's Cross of the Order of the Griffon
 Commander of the Order of the Zähringer Lion, 1st Class, with Oak Leaves
 Commander of the Order of the Württemberg Crown
 Knight of the Order of St. Anna, 1st Class

The University of Halle-Wittenberg appointed him to Honorary Doctor of Political Sciences and the Gdańsk University of Technology granted him the title Doktoringenieur.

, named after Mackensen, was the last class of battlecruisers to be built by Germany in the First World War, the lead ship, SMS Mackensen, was launched on 21 April 1917.

Mackensen was an Honorary Citizen of many cities, such as Danzig, Heilsberg, Buetow, and Tarnovo. In 1915, the newly built rural village of Mackensen in Pomerania was named after him. In various cities, streets were named after him. In 1998 the Mackensenstraße in the Schöneberg district of Berlin was renamed Else-Lasker-Schüler-Straße, based on a claim that Mackensen was one of the "pioneers of National Socialism".

Notes

References
Cecil, Lamar. "The Creation of Nobles in Prussia, 1871-1918." In The American Historical Review, Vol. 75, No. 3. (Feb., 1970), pp. 757–795.
 
Foley, Robert. German Strategy and the Path to Verdun. Cambridge University Press, 2004.
Goda, Norman J. W. "Black Marks: Hitler's Bribery of His Senior Officers during World War II." In The Journal of Modern History, Vol. 72, No. 2. (June, 2000), 413–452.
Hedin, Sven. Große Männer denen ich begegnete, Zweiter Band, Wiesbaden, F.A. Brockhausen, 1953.
Mombauer, Annika. Helmuth von Moltke and the Origins of the First World War. Cambridge University Press, 2001.
Schwarzmüller, Theo. Zwischen Kaiser und "Führer." Generalfeldmarschall August von Mackensen. Eine politische Biographie. Munich: Deutscher Taschenbuch Verlag, 1995.
Silberstein, Gerard E. "The Serbian Campaign of 1915: Its Diplomatic Background." In The American Historical Review, Vol. 73, No. 1. (October 1967), pp. 51–69.
 ''Hausser Elastolin Spielzeug 1939-40' (toy catalog)
 Die Deutsche Wochenschau 16 December 1944 Danish language version. 2:42 min: celebration of 95th birthday of August von Mackensen on December 6, 1944.

External links

 
 

1849 births
1945 deaths
German untitled nobility
German military personnel of the Franco-Prussian War
German Army generals of World War I
Field marshals of Prussia
Field marshals of the German Empire
German monarchists
Grand Crosses of the Military Order of Max Joseph
Grand Crosses of the Military Order of Maria Theresa
People from Nordsachsen
People from the Province of Saxony
Recipients of the Grand Cross of the Iron Cross
Recipients of the Pour le Mérite (military class)
Stahlhelm members
Grand Crosses of the Order of Franz Joseph
Grand Crosses of the Order of Saint Stephen of Hungary
Recipients of the Order of the Medjidie, 1st class
Recipients of the Order of St. Anna, 1st class
German Lutherans
Military personnel from Saxony